The 1992–93 Scottish League Cup was the 47th staging of the Scotland's second most prestigious football knockout competition.

The competition was won by Rangers, who defeated Aberdeen 2–1 in the Final at Hampden Park.

First round

Second round

Third round

Quarter-finals

Semi-finals

Final

References

Sources
Scottish League Cup 1992–93, Soccerbase
Scottish League Cup 1992–93, London Hearts

Scottish League Cup seasons
League Cup Final